Awash International Bank (Amharic: አዋሽ ኢተርናሽናል ባንክ) is a commercial bank in Ethiopia that was established in 1994 by 486 founding shareholders with a paid-up capital of birr 24.2 million and started banking operations on 13 February 1995. As of end of June 2020 the number of shareholders and its paid-up capital increased to over 4369 and Birr 5.87 billion, respectively. Likewise, as of end June 2020, bank's total assets reached Birr 95.6 billion with over 700 branches found across the country, Awash Bank continues to be leading private commercial Bank in Ethiopia.

History
Awash International Bank was founded on 10 November 1994 and started operation on 13 February 1995 with 486 shareholders and paid-up capital of 24.2 million birr. It is named after Awash River. In 2013/14 fiscal year, the bank gained roughly more than 1.37 billion birr, accounting 40% of the whole private banks.

On 24 November 2014, Awash partnered with Misys FusionBanking Essence, a financial software company, to boost its continual growth and the branching process.

References

External links
Official Website

Companies based in Addis Ababa
Banks of Ethiopia
Banks established in 1994
1994 establishments in Ethiopia